The religious belief of the Datuk Keramat worship can be found in Malaysia, Singapore and along the Strait of Malacca. It is a fusion of Malaysian folk religion, Sufism, and Chinese folk religion in Southeast Asia.

Worshippers usually offer flowers, fruits, rice and vegetable to the shrines. Benzoin is also burnt to emit a smoky fragrant smell as part of the ritual.

Origins
According to local legends, all  were once humans who had a standing in society either for their position or special attributes. In several cases, a large anthill structure was present on the grave. With the arrival of Chinese immigrants who carried along with them the Confucian belief of Ancestral Worship and their respect for Nature, both practices converged and formed a new micro-culture as observed today. Datuks, referred to in Chinese as Na Tuk Kong, is considered a localised form in worship of the spirit of the land, along with Tu Di Gong (Earth Deities).

Shrines

Keramat is a small yellow-coloured painted shrines that can be found along sidewalks or under trees in Malaysia. These shrines are usually worshipped by residents living nearby. The shrines are normally of a fusion Chinese-Malay design, with Islamic elements such as the crescent moon decorations.

Types
They were also known to possess great magical powers.

Below are the nine  from the eldest to the youngest:

1. Datuk Panglima Ali (Ali)
2. Datuk Panglima Hitam (Black)
3. Datuk Panglima Harimau (Tiger)
4. Datuk Panglima Hijau (Green)
5. Datuk Panglima Kuning (Yellow)
6. Datuk Panglima Putih (White)
7. Datuk Panglima Bisu (Mute)
8. Datuk Panglima Merah (Red)
9. Datuk Panglima Bongsu (Youngest)

The structure of  worship is diversified according to localities. For example, in the old quarters of Georgetown, the presence of The Seven Brothers or Tujuh Beradik' 'is common while in the royal town of Klang in Selangor, most of the spirits worshipped are believed to be members of the royal court (sultans, officers, warriors etc.), each with their own unique identity.

Worship ritual
Worshippers usually offer fresh flowers,  (betelnuts),  (local hand rolled cigarettes), sliced  (areca nuts) and local fruits.

The  items usually consist of yellow saffron rice, lamb or chicken curries, vegetables,  (bananas), young coconuts, rose syrup,  (local cigars) and local fruits.

Pork items are considered impure and are therefore forbidden in shrines; visitors are also asked to not show disrespect when inside or around a shrine.

Literature
 M. Kamal Hassan (Editor), Ghazali Bin Basri. "Religions and Beliefs" in Encyclopedia of Malaysia. Archipelago Press, Singapore. (2006). 
 Abdul Wahab Bin Hussein Abdullah. “A Sociological Study of Keramat Beliefs in Singapore”. B.A Honours Academic Exercise, Department of Sociology, National University of Singapore, 2000.
 Cheu, Hock Tong. “The Datuk Gong Spirit Cult Movement in Penang: Being and Belonging in Multi-ethnic Malaysia”. Journal of Southeast Asian Studies, vol. 23, no. 1 (September), 381–404.
 Cheu, Hock Tong. “Malay keramat, Chinese worshippers: The Sinicization of Malay Keramats in Malaysia”. Seminar paper, Department of Malay Studies, National University of Singapore, 1994.
 Cheo, Kim Ban and Muriel Speeden, Baba Folk Beliefs and Superstitions. Singapore: Landmark Books, 1998.
 Clammer, John ed. Studies in Chinese folk religion in Singapore and Malaysia. Singapore: Contributions to Southeast Asian ethnography, 1983.
 Elliott, Alan J.A. Chinese Spirit-Medium cult in Singapore. Singapore: Donald Moore, 1964.
 Lessa, William A. et al., Reader in Comparative Religion: An Anthropological Approach. New York, Harper and Row, 1965.
 Mohd Taib Osman, Malay folk beliefs: An integration of disparate elements. Kuala Lumpur: Dewan Bahasa dan Pustaka, 1989.
 Ng, Siew Hua, “The Sam Poh Neo Neo Keramat: A Study of a Baba Chinese Temple”. Contributions to Southeast Asian Ethnography, vol. 25, pt. 1, 1983, 175–177.
 Skeat, W.W. Malay Magic. London: MacMillan, 1900.
 Tan, Chee Beng. The Baba of Melaka. Selangor, Pelanduk Publications, 1988.
 Tjandra, Lukas. Folk religion among the Chinese in Singapore and Malaysia (Ann Arbour, Michigan: University Microfilms International, 1990), 48.
 The Straits Times, "Johor Committee submits report on Houses of Worship," 29 Dec 1989.
 The Straits Times'', "Stop Use of Muslim Signs, Chinese temples Told," 25 June 1987.

See also 

 Candi of Indonesia
 Chinese folk religion in Southeast Asia
 Dargah
 Kejawèn
 Khanqah
 Malaysian folk religion
 Maqam (shrine)
 Maqbara
 Mazar (mausoleum)
 Na Tuk Kong
 Silat
 Tajul muluk
 Tua Pek Kong

External links 
National University of Singapore | Socialization and localization: a case study of the Datuk Gong Cult in Malacca
National University of Singapore | Religion and Society in Malacca

Religion in Malaysia
Religion in Singapore
Islam in Singapore